Evelina Afoa (born 13 September 1998) is a Samoan swimmer, who represented Samoa at the 2016 Summer Olympics. She holds several Samoan records in swimming.

Personal life
Afoa was born in 1998 in Wellington, New Zealand. She attended Brisbane State High School.

Swimming career

2013
Afoa represented Samoa at the 2013 World Aquatics Championships, competing in the 50m and 100 metre backstroke events.

2014
She competed for Samoa at the 2014 Commonwealth Games, racing in the 50 metre freestyle, the 50m and 100 metre backstroke, and the 50 metre butterfly.

At the 2014 FINA World Swimming Championships (25 m), Afoa competed in the 50m freestyle, the 50m and 100m backstroke, and the 50 metre butterfly.

2015
She represented Samoa at the 2015 World Aquatics Championships, racing in the 50m and 100 metre backstroke.

2016
Afoa raced at the 2016 Oceania Swimming Championships.

She competed at the 2016 Summer Olympics, racing in a heat of the 100 metre backstroke.

References

External links
 

Olympic swimmers of Samoa
People educated at Brisbane State High School
Samoan female swimmers
1998 births
Swimmers from Wellington City
Swimmers at the 2016 Summer Olympics
Commonwealth Games competitors for Samoa
Swimmers at the 2014 Commonwealth Games
Female backstroke swimmers
Living people